Fear of a Unique Identity is the fifth album by the UK band Antimatter.

Track listing
All songs written by Mick Moss

Digipack Bonus Tracks (PRO 127-2)

Artbook (2CD/1DVD) Bonus Tracks (PRO 127 LU) DISC TWO - CD

Artbook (2CD/1DVD) Bonus Tracks (PRO 127 LU) DISC THREE - DVD

Credits
Music and lyrics: Mick Moss
Members: Mick Moss (vocals, lead guitar, acoustic and electric guitars, bass guitar, synthesizers, piano, programming, samples, producer, mixer)
Guest appearances: Colin Fromont (drums), Vic Anselmo (vocals), David Hall (violin)
Mastering Engineer: Maor Appelbaum

Video
An official video for "Uniformed and Black" written by Mick Moss and directed by Mehdi Messouci (VÆV) was released prior to the album release.

References

External links
 Antimatter official site

2012 albums
Antimatter (band) albums